Enga Veetu Velan is a 1992 Indian Tamil-language film written, directed and produced by T. Rajendar. The film stars Rajeev and Rekha. It was released on 10 April 1992, and completed a 100-day run.

Plot 
Arun is married to Kalyani, but has an affair with Paapu which leads to Arun disowning Kalyani and their son Velan. Arun in fact does not agree that Velan was born to him. Arun brings Paapu and her family to his house. Paapu is a money minded woman who has affair with many men. Kalyani stays separately with Velan but remains as a maid doing household stuffs in Arun's home. Velan decides to play tricks to unite his parents for which he plans to reveal the true identity of Paapu and her family to Arun.

Velan tactfully plans and Arun gets to know that Paapu and her family has been looting his money without his knowledge which makes him furious. Paapu decides to run away from Arun's home and decides to start living with another man Jambu. Knowing this, Arun feels betrayed and decides to kill Paapu out of anger. Velan also secretly travels along with Arun in his car to stop him from committing the murder. Arun finds Paapu and Jambu in a hotel and fight ensues between them during which Jambu is shot dead. Police arrest Arun charging him for the murder and Velan is taken to the court as the eye witness.

Velan informs in court that Jambu is shot dead by Arun but Arun denies that. Arun pleads with Velan to reveal the truth and realizes his mistake. Arun also informs everyone that Velan is born to him. Post this, Velan informs the truth in the court. Velan informs that Jambu was killed by Selva, who happens to be the brother of Paapu and the blame was put on Arun. Velan also brings the witness, who happens to be the servant at Arun's home. Post this, Paapu's family has been sentenced to imprisonment and Arun is released. Arun is transformed and accepts Velan and Kalyani.

Cast 
Rajeev as Arun
Rekha as Kalyani
Silambarasan as Velan
V. Gopalakrishnan
K. S. Selvaraj
Veera Raghavan as Arun's father
Vennira Aadai Moorthy
Oru Viral Krishna Rao
Kumarimuthu
Sivaraman
Sharmili

Soundtrack 
Soundtrack was composed by T. Rajender who also wrote lyrics for all songs.
Paal Kaavadi
Veeramani Kandene
Naan Potta Sarakku
Chinna Mani Ranga

References

External links 
 

1990s Tamil-language films
1992 films
Films directed by T. Rajendar
Films scored by T. Rajendar
Films with screenplays by T. Rajendar